Mary Spear Tiernan (Nicholas; February 14, 1835 - January 13, 1891) was a 19th-century American writer. Her earliest contributions to literature appeared in Bledsoe's "Southern Review." Her first novel, Homoselle, was the most popular and successful of the "Round Robin Series." Tiernan, encouraged with the reception with which her first novel had met, entered upon an active career, writing for "The Century" and "Harper's Magazine" and publishing two additional novels, Sousette and Jack Horner, 1890. The last of these included a second edition.

Biography
Mary Spear Nicholas was born in Baltimore, Maryland, February 14, 1835. She was the daughter of Elizabeth Byrd Ambler and Robert Carter Nichols.

Much of Tiernan's early life was spent in Richmond, Virginia, which is depicted in her novels, Homoselle, Suzette, and Jack Horner. She was a contributor to The Century and Scribner's Magazines, and to Southern Review. Her literary work was often the most interesting part of the programs of the Eight O'Clock Club, and the Woman's Literary Club, of which she was one of the founders.

On July 23, 1873, she married Charles B. Tiernan, of Baltimore. She died of pneumonia on  January 13, 1891 in Baltimore, and was buried in Green Mount Cemetery.

Selected works

 Homoselle: a Virginia Novel (1881)
 Suzette: A Novel (1885)
 Jack Horner: A Novel (1890)

Notes

References

Attribution
 
 
 

1835 births
1891 deaths
19th-century American writers
19th-century American women writers
People from Baltimore
Writers from Maryland
Deaths from pneumonia in Maryland
Burials at Green Mount Cemetery